River Landing is an ongoing redevelopment district in Saskatoon, Saskatchewan that will create a commercial/cultural development along the bank of the South Saskatchewan River in downtown Saskatoon.

River Landing is divided into two phases. The first phase concentrates on the eastern region of river landing and includes redeveloping the waterfront, a hotel complex and a destination complex. The second phase concentrates on the western region including the cleanup of the old A. L Cole site (a decommissioned electrical power plant that had been torn down in the 1990s), park land and the conversion of a pre-existing electrical service building into a year-round home for the farmer's market (now relocated to 2600 Koyl Ave near the airport), business centre and residential development.

History

Plans for redevelopment of the riverbank have come and gone since the 1970s. One of the first steps towards redeveloping the area was the demolishing of the old Saskatoon Arena in the early 1980s; at one point there were plans to build a new hockey rink and convention centre on the site, but ultimately it was decided to build Saskatchewan Place (now Credit Union Centre) on the city's outskirts. In 1989, the Arena site became an outdoor entertainment venue in conjunction with that year's Canada Summer Games, and proved popular enough that there was talk of the site becoming a permanent outdoor venue. Around this time, the city unveiled plans for a market and hotel on the site as part of its South Downtown Redevelopment scheme which also involved redeveloping several adjacent blocks to the north.

In the early 1990s, despite much criticism, the city council of the day abandoned the market/hotel plan and instead allowed the construction of a senior citizen's residence tower on the former arena site. There was also increased concern regarding rising crime in the neighboring Riversdale community. Despite this, plans for redeveloping the remaining riverbank lands as a cultural, commercial, and entertainment area continued. In the 1990s the A.L. Cole power plant was demolished after sitting unused for nearly a decade, followed in the mid-2000s by the demolition of the Gathercole Building (once Riverview Collegiate), which had formerly housed the Saskatoon Board of Education offices, and was last used as a hospital set in the filming of a short-lived television show.

The last major hurdle towards redevelopment of the site was cleared in 2005 when an agreement was reached with the Royal Canadian Legion over the sale of their building, however later that year the project encountered a stumbling block when the city announced the sudden closure of the century-old Traffic Bridge due to safety concerns; the bridge was expected to be a major access route into River Landing. After considering the possibility of replacing the bridge—an option criticized by the developers of River Landing—the city instead chose to repair the bridge and it reopened to vehicular traffic in September 2006. Along with the project, a roundabout was constructed at the foot of the bridge, being the second to be built in Saskatoon. In 2010, the bridge was closed yet again and on January 10, 2016, the century-old bridge was exploded to be later rebuilt.

Later, in October 2016, development began on the new mixed-use complex, known as River Landing Village. The plans involved 4 highrise buildings, including 2 office towers, a mixed-use condo, and a hotel attached to the condo. The highrise complex was originally planned to be completed within 2 years; this goal could not be met as plans were still being finalized. In November 2022, it was reported that some of Nutrien Tower's glass panels may have fractured due to a manufacturing defect.

Phase one

Phase one consists of:
 riverfront promenade walkway
 new boat dock
 children's water park area
 amphitheatres
 destination complex (including the Frank & Ellen Remai Arts Centre that is owned by the Persephone Theatre)
 century plaza consisting of "Prairie Wind" artwork by Lee-Koopman Projects/Friggstad Downing Henry Architects
 other public art
 River Landing Village – a multi-purpose complex consisting of offices, condominiums, hotel and retail.

Phase two

Phase two consists of:
 riverfront promenade walkway
 Saskatoon Farmers' Market, which has now relocated to 2600 Koyl Ave near the airport
 business centre
 village square
 sounds/visual shielding around the electrical substation
 residential housing

See also
 Riversdale, Saskatoon
 Central Business District, Saskatoon

References

External links
 

Neighbourhoods in Saskatoon
Buildings and structures in Saskatoon